Jason Scott Lee (born November 19, 1966) is an American actor and martial artist. He played Mowgli in Disney's 1994 live-action adaptation of The Jungle Book and Bruce Lee in the 1993 martial arts film Dragon: The Bruce Lee Story. He is not related to Bruce Lee.

Personal life
Lee was born in Los Angeles. He was raised in Hawaii and is of Hawaiian and Chinese descent. He attended school at Pearl City High School.

Lee has been married to Diana Chan since 2008.

Career
Lee started his acting career with small roles in Born in East L.A. (1987) and Back to the Future Part II (1989). In 1990, he appeared in the television film The Lookalike. In 1992, he played his first leading role in the romantic drama Map of the Human Heart. In 1993, he portrayed Bruce Lee in the biopic Dragon: The Bruce Lee Story 
Lee has trained in Bruce Lee's martial art Jeet Kune Do since portraying Lee and continues to train and became a certified instructor under former Bruce Lee student Jerry Poteet. In 1994, he starred in Rapa-Nui and as Mowgli in the live-action adaptation of Rudyard Kipling's The Jungle Book with Lena Headey and John Cleese. Lee was originally considered for the role of Liu Kang in the 1995 film Mortal Kombat, but Lee turned down the role and replaced by Robin Shou instead. In 1998, he played the main villain Caine 607 in the science fiction film Soldier, along with Kurt Russell and Mortal Kombat film director Paul Anderson. In 2000, he played Aladdin in the miniseries Arabian Nights. He did voice-over work for the 2002 Disney animated film Lilo & Stitch.

Lee went on to appear in several direct-to-video films such as Dracula II: Ascension (2001), Timecop 2: The Berlin Decision (2003), and The Prophecy: Forsaken (2005). Lee is among the actors, producers and directors interviewed in the documentary The Slanted Screen (2006), directed by Jeff Adachi, about the representation of Asian and Asian American men in Hollywood.

In 2007, he played Eddie in the sports comedy film Balls of Fury alongside Dan Fogler, in his first theatrically released film since 2002. Lee performed as The King of Siam in the Rodgers and Hammerstein musical The King and I in a production at the London Palladium in 2000 opposite Elaine Paige. Lee made his operatic debut in the non-singing role of Pasha Selim in Hawaii Opera Theatre's production of Mozart's Abduction from the Seraglio at the Blaisdell Concert Hall in Honolulu in February 2009.

Lee was also to perform as The King of Siam in the 2014 Opera Australia production of The King and I in Melbourne opposite Lisa McCune, but was injured, and Lou Diamond Phillips had to take his role.

In 2016, Lee played Hades Dai in Crouching Tiger, Hidden Dragon: Sword of Destiny. In 2019, he voiced the main character, The Swordsman, for Kevin McTurk's crowdsourced short puppetry film, The Haunted Swordsman.

In 2020, he played the villain Böri Khan in Disney’s Mulan, a live action remake of the 1998 animated film of the same name. He also joined the cast of the historical drama The Wind & The Reckoning as Ko’olau, a cowboy who took part in a rebellion against soldiers of the recently instated Provisional Government of Hawaii forcing the displacement of leprosy patients to the Kalaupapa Leprosy Colony in Molokaʻi. Film production happened as the COVID-19 pandemic reached its peak in the islands, the film released in early November 2022.

In 2021, Lee starred as a main role in the Disney+ series Doogie Kameāloha, M.D., a reboot of Doogie Howser, M.D..

Filmography

Film

Television

Documentary

Honors and recognition 
In recognition of Lee's positive impact on the image of Asians in America through his physical, attractive roles, Goldsea, the Asian American magazine website, placed him at Number 7 on its compilation "The 130 Most Inspiring Asian Americans of All Time".

References

External links
 
 

1966 births
Male actors from Los Angeles
Male actors from Hawaii
American male film actors
American male actors of Chinese descent
American people of Native Hawaiian descent
American male voice actors
Living people
American Jeet Kune Do practitioners
20th-century American male actors
21st-century American male actors
American male television actors
Hawaii people of Chinese descent
People from Pearl City, Hawaii